Kulegh may refer to:
 Kulegh Kashi
 Kulegh Kalam